Diogo Castro Santos (born 26 April 1969) is a Portuguese racing driver. He has competed in such series as the EFDA Nations Cup and the German Formula Three Championship. He finished in second-place in the Masters of Formula 3 race of 1992.

References

External links
 

1969 births
Living people
Portuguese racing drivers
EFDA Nations Cup drivers
Formula Ford drivers
German Formula Three Championship drivers